Boysack is a village in Angus, Scotland, four miles north of Arbroath.

Notable residents 
 John Carnegie ( – by May 1750), lawyer, politician and Jacobite rebel.

References

Villages in Angus, Scotland